Daniel Jay Grimm (February 7, 1941 – May 3, 2018) was an American football offensive lineman in the National Football League for the Green Bay Packers, Atlanta Falcons, Baltimore Colts, and the Washington Redskins. He played college football at the University of Colorado and was drafted in the fifth round of the 1963 NFL Draft. Grimm was also selected in the 20th round of the 1963 AFL Draft by the Denver Broncos.

1941 births
2018 deaths
People from Perry, Iowa
American football centers
American football offensive guards
Colorado Buffaloes football players
Green Bay Packers players
Atlanta Falcons players
Baltimore Colts players
Washington Redskins players